Hatharu Manzaru is a series of 2021 Maldivian anthology short films produced and distributed by Raajje TV during Ramadan 1442.

List of productions

Premises

Hayaaiy
Solah (Mohamed Samah), a taxi driver, a divorced man and a father of seven years old child, is asked by her mother, Zahira (Aminath Rasheedha) to look after his grumpy, handicapped father, Nashidh (Ali Farooq) to which he reluctantly agrees. He is groomed by his uncle, Rasheed (Mohamed Rasheed) and has a hard time adjusting and digesting his father's brutal words while trying to sort things with his ex-wife, Muna (Aishath Rishmy) and their son, Suleiman (Mohamed Ethan Jumaih). Soon after, Solah realizes that he is becoming a mirror-reflection of Nashidh, his most disliked person.

Ruqyah
Adhila (Aishath Rishmy), a young woman having a troubled relationship with her younger sister, Zeena (Mariyam Azza), starts having sleeping disorder and her husband, Easa (Ahmed Easa) brings home Usman (Ahmed Sharif) to perform ruqyah. Soon after, when Zeena suspects that Usman and Easa is torturing her sister while confined to a room under the premise of ruqyah, Usman manipulates Easa and the sisters into believing that they are possessed by evil jinn. The women were sexually, physically and psychologically abused in the name of punishing the jinn, which included beatings, being treated as a slave, being denied an adequate amount of food and sleep deprivation.

Fulhi
Reesha (Nashidha Mohamed), a married woman, separated from her husband, Zaidh (Ahmed Easa) who is desperately trying to get back with her. One night, she is greeted by a "glass bottle" at her doorstep which then becomes a routine attachment of her during night time, appearing at her house and following her from work to home, to the point she becomes mentally disturbed. Scared of the recent events, Reesha reconciles with Zaidh and goes back to his house, much to the disappointment of Wadde (Mohamed Waheed), the sorcerer behind the evilness.

Naama
A middle-aged man (Ali Seezan) receives a flash drive which has a video recording of a young man (Mohamed Ishfan) narrating a strange incident he experienced, where he gets accompanied by a random woman (Ansham Mohamed) he met one late night on the beach of Hulhumale'. The video ends when the harassed individual is killed by the woman when he intends to use spell against her with the help of his brother (Ahmed Easa). As soon as the viewer played the video, he finds himself entrapped in the young man's vision.

Cast and characters
Hayaaiy
 Mohamed Rasheed as Rasheed
 Ali Farooq as Nashidh
 Mohamed Samah as Solah
 Mohamed Eithan Jumaih as Suleiman
 Aminath Rasheedha as Zahira (voice-over)
 Aishath Rishmy as Muna (voice-over)
 Mariyam Azza as Sama (voice-over)

Ruqyah
 Aishath Rishmy as Adhila
 Mariyam Azza as Zeena
 Ahmed Easa as Easa
 Ahmed Sharif as Usman
 Ali Farooq as Bodube

Fulhi
 Nashidha Mohamed as Reesha
 Ahmed Easa as Zaidh
 Aisha Ali as Azura
 Mohamed Waheed as Wadde

Naama
 Ali Seezan
 Nashidha Mohamed
 Ahmed Easa
 Mohamed Ishfan
 Ansham Mohamed

Development
For the segment Ruqyah, the screenwriter, Mahdi Ahmed along with director Abdulla Muaz visited a one-room apartment to discuss how the narrative could be spread visually inside the premise. The entire segment was filmed inside this apartment. Initially, the director cast two other actors for the leading role, however due to their scheduling conflict, Muaz later roped in the two off-screen sisters, Aishath Rishmy and Mariyam Azza for their respective roles.

Release and reception
The initial segment, Hayaaiy was released on 16 April 2021. This episode met with positive reviews from critics, where Mariyam Dheema from Muni Avas appraised the work by Ravee Farooq for presenting the storyline in it most "realistic" manner. The next segment Ruqyah was released on 23 April 2021 to positive reviews from critics for its "realistic" and "elaborative" presentation of the "recent fake ruqyah practice", performed by two individuals from R. Dhuvaafaru. The third film, Fulhi was released on 30 April 2021 and was noted for its "portrayal of horror genre in a realistic way from the regular local flicks".

Accolades

References

External links 
 

Short film series
Serial drama television series
Maldivian television shows